Ahmed Meshaima is a paralympic track and field athlete from Bahrain competing mainly in category F37 throwing events.

In the 2004 Summer Paralympics, Ahmed competed in all three T37 class throws, winning a silver medal in the shot put. He followed this in Beijing in the 2008 Summer Paralympics by competing in the shot put and javelin, but failed to match his 2004 achievement and went home without any medals.

References

Year of birth missing (living people)
Living people
Bahraini male shot putters
Bahraini male javelin throwers
Track and field athletes with cerebral palsy
Paralympic athletes of Bahrain
Paralympic silver medalists for Bahrain
Medalists at the 2004 Summer Paralympics
Athletes (track and field) at the 2004 Summer Paralympics
Athletes (track and field) at the 2008 Summer Paralympics
Athletes (track and field) at the 2012 Summer Paralympics
Athletes (track and field) at the 2020 Summer Paralympics
Place of birth missing (living people)
Paralympic medalists in athletics (track and field)
Medalists at the 2010 Asian Para Games
Medalists at the 2014 Asian Para Games